Parijnanashram may refer to the following gurus of the Chitrapur Saraswat Brahmins:

Parijnanashram I, the first guru whose reign was from 1708 to 1720
Parijnanashram II, the third guru whose reign was from 1757 to 1770
Parijnanashram III, the tenth guru whose reign was from 1966 to 1991

See also
 Chitrapur Saraswat Brahmin